The Sunday Sport is a British tabloid newspaper that was founded by David Sullivan in 1986. It mainly publishes images of topless female glamour models, and is well known for publishing sensationalized, fictionalized, and satirical content, alongside celebrity gossip and sports coverage. It has changed from including legitimate journalism throughout its history. A sister title, the Daily Sport, was published from 1991 to 2011, when it ceased publication and went online-only, under separate ownership.

Currently, the tabloid publishes three times a week as the Sunday Sport (Sundays), the Midweek Sport (Wednesdays), and the Weekend Sport (Fridays). The tabloid was previously available in mainstream retailers such as Tesco and The Co-op. However following the decline of Lads' mags and Page 3, it has since only become available in independent newsagents, and remains the only remaining British tabloid to feature glamour models and nudity.

History
Founded by David Sullivan, the Sunday Sport  first hit newsstands on 14 September 1986. It quickly became known for its outlandish and farcical content, with headlines such as "Adolf Hitler Was A Woman", "Aliens Turned Our Son Into A Fish Finger", and "Donkey Robs Bank". Its editors have included Michael Gabbert, Tony Livesey, Paul Carter, and Nick Appleyard. A sister daily title, the Daily Sport, launched in 1991. Livesey's 1998 book Babes, Booze, Orgies and Aliens: The Inside Story of Sport Newspapers offers an insider's perspective on the tabloid's first decade.

The Sunday Sport capitalized on the popularity of The Suns Page 3 feature, but made sexualized content more of a primary focus by printing topless glamour models across multiple pages and publishing a "nipple count" to highlight how many exposed breasts it featured. The tabloid courted controversy by featuring 15-year-old aspiring glamour models in scantily clad poses, counting down the days until it could legally show them topless on their 16th birthdays, as it did with Linsey Dawn McKenzie and Hannah Claydon, among others.

The Sunday Sport's circulation reached an all-time high of 167,473 in 2005, and Sullivan sold his Sunday Sport and Daily Sport titles in 2007 for £40 million. Circulation declined markedly thereafter, with the new parent company, Sport Media Group, withdrawing the titles from the newspaper industry's monthly circulation audit in 2009. In the same year, Sullivan stepped in to save Sport Media Group with a £1.68 million loan. The company entered administration on 1 April 2011, at which point publisher Richard Desmond refused to continue printing the titles because of outstanding debts. The Sunday Sport returned to newsstands several weeks later on 8 May 2011, after Sullivan reacquired it for £50,000. The Daily Sport was sold off separately to Grant Miller.

The paper currently appears three times a week as the Sunday Sport (Sundays), the Midweek Sport (Wednesdays), and the Weekend Sport (Fridays), all published by Sullivan's company Sunday Sport (2011) Limited.

Controversies
The tabloid contains extensive advertising for sexual services, mainly adult telephone chat lines. In 2016, the Advertising Standards Authority banned sexually explicit advertisements for chat lines from the back page of the Sunday Sport over concerns that children could easily see them.

See also
Sport Newspapers

Notes

References

External links

 You couldn't make it up: 'Sport' editor quits for BBC, The Independent, 17 August 2006

National newspapers published in the United Kingdom
Publications established in 1986
1986 establishments in the United Kingdom
Sunday newspapers published in the United Kingdom
Nudity in print media